Sirk is a village and municipality in the Banská Bystrica Region of Slovakia.

Sirk may also refer to:
 Sirk, Chaharmahal and Bakhtiari, a village in Iran
 Sirk, Isfahan, a village in Kuhpayeh Rural District, Kashan County, Isfahan Province, Iran
 širk, the Arabic spelling of Shirk (Islam)

People with the surname
Artur Sirk (1900–1937), Estonian political and military figure
Douglas Sirk (1897–1987), German film director
Lea Sirk (born 1989), Slovenian pop singer
Rauno Sirk (born 1975), Estonian military commander
Rok Sirk (born 1993), Slovenian footballer

See also
Boudewijn Sirks (born 1947), Dutch academic lawyer, professor and papyrologist specializing in Roman law
Sirk'i (disambiguation)